The Barakaldo Theatre (Spanish: Teatro Barakaldo, Basque: Barakaldo Antzokia) in Basque is a theater in Barakaldo, Spain. It was inaugurated in 1990.

The project, presented in 1987, is the work of architect Augusto Terrero. During the decades of the 60s and 70s of the 20th century, the theater was a platform for the exhibition of the so-called independent theater.

See also 

 BAI Performing Arts Training Center
 Olatz Gorrotxategi

References 

Buildings and structures in Bilbao

Theatres completed in 1990